Secret Agent (1943) is the last of seventeen animated Technicolor short films based upon the DC Comics character Superman. Produced by Famous Studios, the cartoon was originally released to theaters by Paramount Pictures on July 30, 1943. This is the only short in which Lois Lane doesn't appear, although a female federal agent who looks identical to Lois (just with blonde hair) appears, and is also voiced by Joan Alexander.

Plot
Clark Kent is driving in town and stops at a drug store to talk to his chief about his assignment. Outside, there is a car chase of a group of men that are trying to gun down another car. The gun men's car crashes into the drug store, and they steal Clark's car. Clark dashes to catch up to the gangsters and grabs on to the rear of his car. The two cars pass by a police car who try to chase them down. The gangsters try to shoot at the police, but Clark grabs the gangster's gun and throws it away. The gangsters use another gun to blow out their victim's tires. The gangsters speed off with Clark on their rear bumper.

The agent steps out of her damaged car and tells the policemen that she needs to see the police chief. She explains to him that she needs to take records to Washington, D.C. on the gang, who were just trying to gun her down. For six months she tricked them into thinking that she was a part of them and got records of member's names and their plans.

Clark is captured and learns that these gangsters are trying to get the records back from the agent, so they plan to stop her at the bridge to the airport.

She gets a police escort to the airport, but it is attacked by the gangsters. During the gunfight, the policeman that was driving for the agent steps out of his car to shoot back at the gangsters. The agent drives through the fighting to the airport. Another group of the saboteurs positioned at a bridge get to the controls of the bridge. They turn the bridge to block the agent, but she keeps on driving until she realizes that the road is not connected to the bridge and jumps out of the car. The car drives off the bridge and crashes into an electrical tower. The agent tries to reverse the bridge by getting to the bridge controls, but is nearly shot by one of gangsters. She reverses the bridge's turning, but the electric tower begins to fall and smashes into the bridge control room. She falls onto the bridge's turning mechanism and is knocked out while the massive gear in the turning mechanism slowly creeps toward her unconscious body.

The gangster on the bridge telephones his superior and tells him that the agent is trapped on the bridge and he is about to be overrun by cops, but is cut off as the police open fire on him. The gangster's boss locks Clark in another room and leaves with his henchmen to get the agent's records. Clark breaks his bindings, changes into Superman and jumps onto the cable of the elevator the gangsters were taking, pulls their elevator up and ties off the elevator cable with the gangsters above the top floor to keep them from getting to the agent. Superman flies to the bridge and saves the agent. He picks her up, flies her to Washington D.C and flies away, with a salute to the flag.

Voice cast
 Bud Collyer as Clark Kent / Superman, Nazi Saboteurs
 Joan Alexander as Secret Agent
 Jackson Beck as Narrator, Police Chief, Nazi Saboteurs
 Julian Noa as Perry White, Police Officer, Nazi Saboteurs
 Jack Mercer as Nazi Saboteurs

References

External links
 
 
 Secret Agent at the Internet Archive
 Secret Agent cast & crew list

1943 films
1943 animated films
1940s American animated films
1940s animated short films
1940s animated superhero films
1940s spy films
Superman animated shorts
Films set in Washington, D.C.
Paramount Pictures short films
1940s English-language films